Fellows of the Royal Society elected in 1880.

Fellows

 Thomas Clifford Allbutt (1836–1925)
 John Attfield (1835–1911)
 Thomas George Baring (1826–1904)
 Alexander James Beresford-Hope (1820–1887)
 Henry Francis Blanford (1834–1893)
 William Henry Dallinger (1842–1909)
 Henry Haversham Godwin-Austen (1834–1923)
 Charles Graves (1812–1899)
 David Edward Hughes (1831–1900)
 Henry Martyn Jeffery (1826–1891)
 Sir George Jessel (1824–1883)
 Frederick McCoy (1823–1899)
 John Fletcher Moulton (1844–1921)
 Charles Niven (1845–1923)
 John Rae (1813–1893)
 James Emerson Reynolds (1844–1920)
 William Turner Thiselton-Dyer (1843–1928)
 William Augustus Tilden (1842–1926)

References

1880 in science
1880
1880 in the United Kingdom